The 1989 FIBA Europe Under-16 Championship (known at that time as 1989 European Championship for Cadets) was the 10th edition of the FIBA Europe Under-16 Championship. The cities of Guadalajara, Tarancón and Cuenca, in Spain, hosted the tournament. Greece won the trophy for the first time.

Teams

Preliminary round
The twelve teams were allocated in two groups of six teams each.

Group A

Group B

Knockout stage

9th–12th playoffs

5th–8th playoffs

Championship

Final standings

References
FIBA Archive
FIBA Europe Archive

FIBA U16 European Championship
1989–90 in European basketball
1989–90 in Spanish basketball
International youth basketball competitions hosted by Spain